The 2014 Tour of Chongming Island World Cup was a women's bicycle race in China.

Results

World Cup standings
Standings after 5 of 9 2014 UCI Women's Road World Cup races.

Individuals

Team: Boels–Dolmans Cycling Team
Mountain: Pauline Ferrand-Prévot
Sprint: Rebecca Wiasak
Youth: Pauline Ferrand-Prévot

References

2014 UCI Women's Road World Cup
2014 in Chinese sport
Tour of Chongming Island